The pyramid-shaped maxillary sinus (or antrum of Highmore) is the largest of the paranasal sinuses, located in the maxilla. It drains into the middle meatus of the nose through the semilunar hiatus. It is located to the side of the nasal cavity, and below the orbit.

Structure
It is the largest air sinus in the body. Found in the body of the maxilla, this sinus has three recesses: an alveolar recess pointed inferiorly, bounded  by the alveolar process of the maxilla; a zygomatic recess pointed laterally, bounded by the zygomatic bone; and an infraorbital recess pointed superiorly, bounded by the inferior orbital surface of the maxilla. The medial wall is composed primarily of cartilage. The ostia for drainage are located high on the medial wall and open into the semilunar hiatus of the lateral nasal cavity; because of the position of the ostia, gravity cannot drain the maxillary sinus contents when the head is erect (see pathology). The ostium of the maxillary sinus is high up on the medial wall and on average is 2.4 mm in diameter; with a mean volume of about 10 ml.

The sinus is lined with mucoperiosteum, with cilia that beat toward the ostia. This membranous lining is also referred to as the Schneiderian membrane, which is histologically a bilaminar membrane with pseudostratified ciliated columnar epithelial cells on the internal (or cavernous) side and periosteum on the osseous side. The size of the sinuses varies in different skulls, and even on the two sides of the same skull.

The infraorbital canal usually projects into the cavity as a well-marked ridge extending from the roof to the anterior wall; additional ridges are sometimes seen in the posterior wall of the cavity and are caused by the alveolar canals.

The mucous membranes receive their postganglionic parasympathetic nerve fibres for mucous secretion from the pterygopalatine ganglion. The preganglionic parasympathetic fibres are coming to this ganglion through the greater petrosal nerve (a branch of the facial nerve) and the nerve of the pterygoid canal. The superior alveolar (anterior, middle, and posterior) nerves, branches of the maxillary nerve provide sensory innervation.

Walls
The nasal wall of the maxillary sinus, or base, presents, in the disarticulated bone, a large, irregular aperture, communicating with the nasal cavity. In the articulated skull this aperture is much reduced in size by the following bones:
 the uncinate process of the ethmoid above,
 the ethmoidal process of the inferior nasal concha below,
 the vertical part of the palatine behind,
 and a small part of the lacrimal above and in front.

The sinus communicates through an opening into the semilunar hiatus on the lateral nasal wall.

On the posterior wall are the alveolar canals, transmitting the posterior superior alveolar vessels and nerves to the molar teeth.

The floor is formed by the alveolar process, and, if the sinus is of an average size, is on a level with the floor of the nose; if the sinus is large it reaches below this level. Projecting into the floor of the antrum are several conical processes, corresponding to the roots of the first and second maxillary molar teeth; in some cases the floor can be perforated by the apices of the teeth.

The roof is formed by floor of the orbit. It is traversed by infraorbital nerves and vessels.

Development
Maxillary sinus is the first paranasal sinuses to form. At birth, it is about 6 to 8 cm3 in volume, elongated, as is orientated in antero-posterior direction, located at the next to the medial orbital wall of the eye. The lateral wall of the maxillary sinus goes beneath the medial orbital wall during the first year of life, extends laterally pass the infraorbital groove by the age of four years, and reach the maxilla by the age of nine years. After the first permanent tooth erupted at the age of six to seven, aeration of maxillary sinus is the main growth feature. At the final phase of aeration, the floor of maxillary sinus is four to five milimetres below the floor of nasal cavity. However, timing of maxillary sinus growth is variable in different people.

Clinical significance

Maxillary sinusitis

Maxillary sinusitis is inflammation of the maxillary sinuses. The symptoms of sinusitis are headache, usually near the involved sinus, and foul-smelling nasal or pharyngeal discharge, possibly with some systemic signs of infection such as fever and weakness. The skin over the involved sinus can be tender, hot, and even reddened due to the inflammatory process in the area. On radiographs, there is opacification (or cloudiness) of the usually translucent sinus due to retained mucus.

Maxillary sinusitis is common due to the close anatomic relation of the frontal sinus, anterior ethmoidal sinus and the maxillary teeth, allowing for easy spread of infection. Differential diagnosis of dental problems needs to be done due to the close proximity to the teeth since the pain from sinusitis can seem to be dentally related.  Furthermore, the drainage orifice lies near the roof of the sinus, and so the maxillary sinus does not drain well, and infection develops more easily. The maxillary sinus may drain into the  mouth via an abnormal opening, an oroantral fistula, a particular risk after tooth extraction.

Oro-antral communication (OAC) 
An OAC is an abnormal physical communication between the maxillary sinus and the mouth. This opening is only present when the structures, that normally separates the mouth and sinus into 2 separate compartments, are lost.

There are many causes of an OAC. The most common reason is following extraction of a posterior maxillary (upper) premolar or molar tooth. Other causes include trauma, pathology (e.g. tumours or cysts), infection or iatrogenic damage during surgery. Iatrogenic damage during dental treatment accounts for nearly half of the incidence of dental-related maxillary sinusitis. There is always a thin layer of mucous membrane (Schneiderian membrane) and usually bone between the roots of the upper back teeth and the floor of the maxillary sinus. However, the bone can vary in thickness in different individuals, ranging from complete absence to 12mm thick. Therefore, in certain individuals the membrane +/- the bony floor of the sinus can be perforated easily, creating an opening into the mouth when a tooth is extracted.

An OAC that is smaller than 2mm can heal spontaneously i.e. closure of the opening. Those that are larger than 2mm have a higher chance of developing into oro-antral fistula (OAF). The passage is only defined as an OAF if it is persistent and lined by epithelium. Epithelialisation happens when an OAC persist for at least 2–3 days and oral epithelial cells proliferate to line the defect. Large defects (more than 2mm) should be surgically closed as soon as possible to avoid accumulation of food and saliva which could contaminate the maxillary sinus, leading to infection (sinusitis). Various surgical techniques can be employed to manage an OAF but the most common involves pulling and stitching some soft tissue from the gum to cover the opening (i.e. soft tissue flap).

Sinusitis treatment
Traditionally the treatment of acute maxillary sinusitis is usually prescription of a broad-spectrum cephalosporin antibiotic resistant to beta-lactamase, administered for 10 days. Recent studies have found that the cause of chronic sinus infections lies in the nasal mucus, not in the nasal and sinus tissue targeted by standard treatment. This suggests a beneficial effect in treatments that target primarily the underlying and presumably damage-inflicting nasal and sinus membrane inflammation, instead of the secondary bacterial infection that has been the primary target of past treatments for the disease. Also, surgical procedures with chronic sinus infections are now changing with the direct removal of the mucus, which is loaded with toxins from the inflammatory cells, rather than the inflamed tissue during surgery. Leaving the mucus behind might predispose early recurrence of the chronic sinus infection. If any surgery is performed, it is to enlarge the ostia in the lateral walls of the nasal cavity, creating adequate drainage.

Cancer
Carcinoma of the maxillary sinus may invade the palate and cause dental pain. It may also block the nasolacrimal duct. Spread of the tumor into the orbit causes proptosis.

Age
With age, the enlarging maxillary sinus may even begin to surround the roots of the maxillary posterior teeth and extend its margins into the body of the zygomatic bone. If the maxillary posterior teeth are lost, the maxillary sinus may expand even more, thinning the bony floor of the alveolar process so that only a thin shell of bone is present.

History
The maxillary sinus was first discovered and illustrated by Leonardo da Vinci, but the earliest attribution of significance was given to Nathaniel Highmore, the British surgeon and anatomist who described it in detail in his 1651 treatise.

See also

Ohngren's line
Zygomatic complex fracture

References

External links

 
 
 
 Maxillary Sinus: Normal Anatomy & Variants at http://uwmsk.org/sinusanatomy2/Maxillary-Normal.html
 Cancer in the maxillary sinus, Stanford University at http://cancer.stanford.edu/headneck/sinus/sinus_max.html

Bones of the head and neck